Ryan Agar (born 21 June 1987) is an Australian tennis player playing on the ATP Challenger Tour. On 21 July 2014, he reached his highest ATP singles ranking of 647 and his highest doubles ranking of 205 achieved on 5 May 2014.

Tour titles

Doubles

External links
 
 
 

1987 births
Living people
Australian male tennis players
21st-century Australian people